Integration Point, Inc. is a privately owned software company headquartered in Charlotte, North Carolina, USA. The company specializes in the development, implementation and support of global trade management software to efficiently manage the import and export of goods around the world.
This Software-as-a-Service (Saas) model was built utilizing cloud technology, which provides companies with a Global Trade Network that touches every transaction affecting trade compliance. 

Integration Point is based in Charlotte, North Carolina, and has offices in Rochester, New York; El Paso, Texas;  Reynosa, Mexico; Torreon, Mexico;  Brussels, Belgium; Vadodara, India; Sao Paulo, Brazil;  Tbilisi, Republic of Georgia;  Frankfurt, Germany; Shanghai, China;  Cape Town, South Africa; Kuala Lumpur, Malaysia, and Melbourne, Australia.

History 

Integration Point was founded in 2002 by Tom Barnes, who maintains his role as CEO of the company.

In 2002, Clay Perry joined Integration Point with 20 years of experience in managing technology teams throughout the manufacturing and distribution sectors of international trade.

In 2003, Melissa Irmen joined Integration Point and plays an active role in various international trade initiatives and organizations, and speaks to media and conferences regularly on  global trade topics including   WCO, NAFTZ, ICPA, and AAEI.

In October 2018, Integration Point announced it was being acquired by Thomson Reuters for an undisclosed amount.

References

External links 
 

Defunct software companies of the United States
Companies based in Charlotte, North Carolina